Tullius Crispinus was Praetorian Prefect with Titus Flavius Genialis in 193 AD. He was appointed by Didius Julianus, who had just bought the throne from the guard. Didius Julianus had planned to name Septimius Severus his co-emperor and sent Crispinus to deliver the offer. Severus killed him and thus declined the offer.

Sources
 Historia Augusta, Life of Didius Julianus
 Anthony R. Birley, Septimius Severus: The African Emperor, p. 99
 Anthony R. Birley, Lives of the Later Caesars, pp. 197-198

2nd-century Romans
Praetorian prefects
Tullii